Ramand-e Shomali Rural District is a rural district (dehestan) in Khorramdasht District, Takestan County, Qazvin Province, Iran. At the 2006 census, its population was 6,944, in 1,838 families.  The rural district has 16 villages.

References 

Rural Districts of Qazvin Province
Takestan County